Protein poisoning (also referred to colloquially as rabbit starvation, mal de caribou, or fat starvation) is an acute form of malnutrition caused by a diet deficient in fat and carbohydrates, where almost all calories consumed come from the protein in lean meat. The concept is discussed in the context of paleoanthropological investigations into the diet of ancient humans, especially during the last glacial maximum and at high latitudes.

The term rabbit starvation originates from the fact that rabbit meat is very lean, with almost all of its caloric content from protein rather than fat, and therefore a food which, if consumed exclusively, would cause protein poisoning. Animals in harsh, cold environments similarly become lean.

The reported symptoms include initial nausea and fatigue, followed by diarrhea and ultimately death.

Observations
In Appian's Roman History, Volume I, Book VI: The Wars in Spain, Chapter IX, page 223, the author notes a multitude of Roman soldiers dying of severe diarrhea after eating mostly rabbits while besieging the city Intercatia in approx 150 B.C. Appian wrote:

The explorer Vilhjalmur Stefansson is said to have lived for years exclusively on game meat and fish, with no ill effects.  The same is true for his fellow explorer Karsten Anderson.  As part of his promotion of meat-only diet modeled on Inuit cuisine, and to demonstrate the effects, in New York City beginning in February 1928, Stefansson and Anderson "lived and ate in the metabolism ward of Russell Sage Institute of Pathology of Bellevue Hospital, New York" for a year, with their metabolic performance closely observed, all this partly funded by the Institute of American Meat Packers.  Researchers hoping to replicate Stefansson's experience with rabbit starvation in the field urged him to cut the fat intake in his all-meat diet to zero.  He did, and experienced a much quicker onset of diarrhea than in the field.  With fat added back in, Stefansson recovered, although with a 10-day period of constipation afterwards.  The study reported finding no previous medical literature examining either the effects of meat-only diets, which appear to be sustainable, or on rabbit starvation, which is fatal.

Stefansson wrote:  

A World War II-era Arctic survival booklet issued by the Flight Control Command of the United States Army Air Forces included this emphatic warning:  "Because of the importance of fats, under no conditions limit yourself to a meat diet of rabbit just because they happen to be plentiful in the region where you are forced down.  A continued diet of rabbit will produce rabbit starvation -- diarrhea will begin in about a week and if the diet is continued DEATH MAY RESULT."

Physiology
The U.S. and Canadian Dietary Reference Intake review for protein mentions "rabbit starvation", but concluded that there was not sufficient evidence by 2005 to establish a tolerable upper intake level, i.e., an upper limit for how much protein can be safely consumed.

According to Bilsborough and Mann in 2006, protein intake is mainly restricted by the urea cycle, but deriving more than 35% of energy needs from protein leads to health problems. They suggested an upper limit of 25% or 2-2.5 g/kg, "corresponding to 176 g protein per day for an 80 kg individual", but stated that humans can theoretically use much larger amounts than this for energy. For arctic hunter-gatherers, the amount can seasonally increase to 45%. Protein intakes above 35% of energy needs have also been shown to decrease testosterone and increase cortisol levels. This is thought to be part of the body's attempt to upregulate the urea cycle, and increase nitrogen excretion.

See also

 Atkins diet
 Country food / Inuit diet – Traditional diet of the Inuit and First Nations
 Christopher McCandless - an assumed protein poisoning victim
 Dukan Diet
 Kwashiorkor – Disease resulting from sufficient caloric intake with very low protein content
 Low-carbohydrate diet
 Marasmus – Disease caused by inadequate caloric intake
 Montignac diet
 Protein Power
 Protein toxicity – Damage caused by buildup of protein metabolic waste products in the bloodstream
 Proteopathy – Damage caused by misfolded proteins
 Scarsdale diet
 Stillman diet
 Sugar Busters!
 Zone diet

References

Further reading

Malnutrition
Carnivory
Survival skills
Proteins as nutrients